Magia may be an insect genus or the name of the Roman gens Magia.

Magia may also refer to:

Music
Magia (Álvaro Soler album), 2021
"Magia" (Álvaro Soler song), a song from the album
Magia (Jerry Rivera album), 1995
"Magia", a song from the album
Magia (Shakira album)
"Magia", a song from the album
Magia (Maluma album)
"Magia", a song from the album
Magia (Toque Profundo album), 2002
"Magia" (Kalafina song) 
"Magia", a song from Grachi
"Magia", a song by OV7, cover of the Starship song "Nothing's Gonna Stop Us Now" 
"Magia", a song by Rosana

Other
 Magia, wife of the notorious Roman poisoner Oppianicus, who married her in order to gain her family's fortune
Mágia, a 1917 Hungarian drama film

See also
Magic (disambiguation)